A Referendum Commission is an independent statutory body in Ireland which had been set up in advance of referendums in Ireland from 1998 to 2019. The Referendum Act 1998 as amended by the Referendum Act 2001 provided for the establishment of the body. It was superseded in 2023 by the Electoral Commission, established on a permanent basis.

Background
In McKenna v. An Taoiseach (No. 2) (1995), the Supreme Court of Ireland upheld a challenge from Patricia McKenna to public expenditure to promote a Yes vote in the constitutional referendum on divorce. The Referendum Act 1998 provided for the establishment of a commission for each referendum to provide information about the contents of amendment. The first Referendum Commission was set up for the Amsterdam Treaty referendum.

Composition
The 1998 Act, as amended, provided that the Chairperson of the commission should be a former judge of the Supreme Court or Court of Appeal or a serving or former judge of the High Court nominated by the Chief Justice. The other members of the commission are the Comptroller and Auditor General, the Ombudsman, the Clerk of Dáil Éireann and the Clerk of Seanad Éireann. In the event any of those offices are vacant, the 1998 Act provided that the following be appointed respectively instead: Secretary and Director of Audit of the Office of the Comptroller and Auditor General, Director of the Office of the Ombudsman, Clerk Assistant of Dáil Éireann, Clerk Assistant of Seanad Éireann.

The members of the last Referendum Commission, established for the Thirty-eighth Amendment held in 2019, were:

Functions
Under the Referendum Act 1998 the commission initially had the role of setting out the arguments for and against referendum proposals, having regard to submissions received from the public. Following the passing of the Referendum Act 2001 the commission no longer has a statutory function in relation to putting the arguments for and against referendum proposals. The 2001 Act also removed from the commission the statutory function of fostering and promoting debate or discussion on referendum proposals.

A new referendum commission may be set up in advance for each new referendum that takes place, if the Minister for Housing, Planning and Local Government makes a ministerial order to appoint a commission. The current primary role of the commission is to explain the subject matter of referendum proposals, to promote public awareness of the referendum and to encourage the electorate to vote. It may use television, radio, press, outdoor and cinema advertising and any other media over the weeks in advance of the referendum to give general information about the issues involved. It may help citizens find out some basic information about how to register to vote. The commission's information booklets are also produced in braille and audiotape for persons with visual impairments. A publication in Irish Sign Language is also produced. A dedicated website is created for the referendum.

Once the commission completes its functions it furnishes a report to the Minister, within six months. The report details the carrying out of its functions, and the commission then dissolves one month after its submission.

List of commissions

Repeal
The Electoral Reform Act 2022 repealed the Referendum Act 1998. The Electoral Commission established under the same act was given the equivalent functions as Referendum Commission. The Commission was established in 2023.

See also
Amendments to the Constitution of Ireland
Constitution of Ireland

References

External links

Amendments of the Constitution of Ireland
Constitution of Ireland
Politics of the Republic of Ireland
Referendums in the Republic of Ireland